Comanche Crossing is a 1968 Western film directed by Larry Buchanan. Buchanan worked on the film in 1967–68 with Tony Huston. It was shot in Big Bend Country near the US-Mexican border, with Cynthia Hull as a Native American and Huston as a Comanche warrior. The film was never released.

Buchanan says it was one of his more personal projects that he made between exploitation pictures; he later called it "a fine little film".

Cast
Cynthia Hull 
Tony Huston 
Caruth C. Byrd

Production
The film was financed by Carunth C. Byrd who helped finance several other movies from Buchanan, including Sam.

References

External links

Comanche Crossing at Letterbox DVD

1968 films
1968 Western (genre) films
Films directed by Larry Buchanan
American Western (genre) films
1960s English-language films
1960s American films